Hiroko Matsuura (松浦 寛子 Matsuura Hiroko, born July 15, 1990) is a Japanese volleyball player who plays for Baki-Azeryol.

Clubs
Kumamoto Municipal Nagamine Junior High → Higashikyushu Ryukoku High School (2006–2009) → NEC Red Rockets(2009-2012) → Baki-Azeryol（2012-）

National team
 Youth national team (2007)
 Junior national team (2008)

Honours

Individuals
2007: World Youth Volleyball championship - Spike award

Team
2011 60th Kurowashiki All Japan Volleyball Tournament -  Runner-up, with NEC Red Rockets.

National team

Junior team
2008: Champion in the 14th Asian Junior Volleyball Championship

References

External links
JVA Biography
NEC Red Rockets Official Website

Japanese women's volleyball players
Living people
1990 births